Stanhopea xytriophora is a species of orchid found from southern Peru to Bolivia.

References

External links 
 
 

xytriophora
Orchids of Bolivia
Orchids of Peru